William Lindsay (1802–1866) was a Scottish minister of the United Presbyterian Church.

Life
Born at Irvine, Ayrshire, Lindsay studied at Glasgow University, and the theological hall of the Relief Church in Paisley, in its early days, under Dr James Thomson.

Lindsay was ordained minister of the Relief Church on 27 April 1830, with first charge the newly formed congregation at Johnstone, Renfrewshire. On 22 November 1832 he was translated to Dovehill Relief Church, Glasgow, a congregation formed in 1766, where he acted as colleague of John Barr, and on Barr's death in 1839 succeeding to the sole charge.

In 1841 Lindsay was appointed professor of exegetical theology and biblical criticism by the Relief Synod. He moved with his congregation from Dovehill to a new church in Cathedral Street, Glasgow, in 1844, as the Cathedral Street Relief Church. The degree of D.D. was conferred on him by the University of Glasgow in 1844.

After the union of the Relief and other secession churches, forming the United Presbyterian Church in 1847, Lindsay was appointed professor of sacred languages and biblical criticism by the new Synod; and with John Brown, James Harper, Neil McMichael, and John Eadie he formed the staff of the United Presbyterian Hall. On the death of  Brown on 13 October 1858, Lindsay was transferred to the chair of exegetical theology. He retained his professorship, with the charge of Cathedral Street United Presbyterian Church till his death, which took place suddenly on Sunday, 3 June 1866.

Works
Lindsay's major works were:

Life of Rev. Thomas Gillespie of Carnock, one of the Founders of the Relief Church, 1849, the third volume of the "United Presbyterian Fathers" series
The Miracles of Scripture defended from the assaults of Modern Scepticism, lecture delivered at the opening of the United Presbyterian Hall in 1850.
 The Law of Marriage 1855 ; 2nd edit. 1871.
 Exposition of Epistle to the Hebrews (edited, 1867) by George Brooks, who succeeded him in the Johnstone pastorate.

Notes

Attribution

1802 births
1866 deaths
Alumni of the University of Glasgow
Ministers of the Relief Church
Ministers of the United Presbyterian Church (Scotland)